Nanlishi Lu Station is a station on Line 1 of the Beijing Subway.

Station Layout 
The station has an underground island platform.

Exits 
There are 5 exits, lettered A, B, C, D1, and D2. Exit C is accessible.

References 

Beijing Subway stations in Xicheng District
Railway stations in China opened in 1971